How to Die in Oregon is a 2011 American documentary film produced and directed by Peter Richardson. It is set in the U.S. state of Oregon and covers the state's Death with Dignity Act that allows terminally ill patients to self-administer barbiturates prescribed by their physician to end their own life, referred to as assisted suicide by opponents and medical aid in dying by proponents.

Richardson spent nearly a year with 54-year-old Cody Curtis, an OHSU faculty member with liver cancer, as she grappled with the decision or not to take a lethal dose of a barbiturate.

Release
The film was released in January 2011 at the 27th Sundance Film Festival and began airing on HBO later in the year. Peter Richardson, a native Oregonian, got the idea to produce the film as the state's law was upheld by the Supreme Court of the United States in the 2006 case Gonzales v. Oregon.

Critical reception
How to Die in Oregon was well received by critics, currently holding a 100% "fresh" rating on Rotten Tomatoes based on 10 reviews.

The film won the Grand Jury Prize for Documentaries at the 27th Sundance Film Festival.

References

External links
 
 
 

2011 films
2011 documentary films
American documentary films
Assisted suicide
Assisted suicide in the United States
Documentary films about suicide
Euthanasia in the United States
Films about euthanasia
Films scored by Max Richter
Films set in Oregon
Films shot in Oregon
Filmed suicides
Sundance Film Festival award winners
Documentary films about Oregon
2010s English-language films
2010s American films
Films about disability